The X Factor has two versions in China:

The X Factor: Ji Qing Chang Xiang, broadcast between 2011 and 2012
The X Factor: Zhongguo Zui Qiang Yin, broadcast from 2013

China
X Factor
Chinese music television series